The 2015–16 Fairfield Stags men's basketball team represented Fairfield University during the 2015–16 NCAA Division I men's basketball season. The Stags, led by fifth year head coach Sydney Johnson, played their home games at Webster Bank Arena and were members of the Metro Atlantic Athletic Conference. They finished the season 19–14, 12–8 in MAAC play to finish in a tie for fourth place. They defeated Saint Peter's in the quarterfinals of the MAAC tournament to advance to the semifinals where they lost to Monmouth. They were invited to the CollegeInsider.com Tournament where they lost in the first round to New Hampshire.

Roster

Schedule

|-
!colspan=9 style="background:#C41E3A; color:#FFFFFF;"| Exhibition

|-
!colspan=9 style="background:#C41E3A; color:#FFFFFF;"| Regular season

|-
!colspan=9 style="background:#C41E3A; color:#FFFFFF;"| MAAC tournament

|-
!colspan=9 style="background:#C41E3A; color:#FFFFFF;"| CIT

References

Fairfield Stags men's basketball seasons
Fairfield
Fairfield
Fairfield Stags
Fairfield Stags